Youri de Winter (born 26 June 1998) is a Dutch footballer who plays as a winger or attacker for Excelsior Maassluis.

Career

At the age of 17, de Winter joined the English Nike Academy.

In 2019, he signed for Scheveningen in the Dutch third division from the reserves of Dutch top flight side Sparta.

In 2020, de Winter signed for Kerkyra in the Greece, where he made 3 league appearances and scored 1 goal, before joining Dutch third division club Excelsior Maassluis after a trial.

References

External links
 
 

Dutch footballers
Living people
Expatriate footballers in Greece
Dutch expatriate footballers
Dutch expatriate sportspeople in Greece
1998 births
Association football forwards
Association football wingers
Super League Greece 2 players
Tweede Divisie players
PAE Kerkyra players
SVV Scheveningen players
Excelsior Maassluis players